Tanikawauchi Dam  is a gravity dam located in Kagoshima Prefecture in Japan. The dam is used for irrigation. The catchment area of the dam is 14.1 km2. The dam impounds about 12  ha of land when full and can store 2170 thousand cubic meters of water. The construction of the dam was started on 1984 and completed in 2012.

See also
List of dams in Japan

References

Dams in Kagoshima Prefecture